Rangampally is a village and panchayat in Vikarabad district, [[Telangana [TS]], India. It falls under [[Parigi Mandal, Vikarabad district|].

References

Villages in Vikarabad district